BR Schlager (until 20 January 2021 Bayern plus) is a German, public radio station owned and operated by the Bayerischer Rundfunk (BR).

References

Radio stations in Germany
Radio stations established in 2008
2008 establishments in Germany
Mass media in Munich
Bayerischer Rundfunk